Bushmanland is an arid area south of the Orange River and west of Kenhardt and east of Springbok (Namaqualand) in the Northern Cape, South Africa.

It includes the towns of Pofadder and Aggeneys, and places such as Namies and Bosluis Pan. Extensive plains are dotted with inselbergs like the Gamsberg.

Bushmanland is an arid area inland from Namaqualand. It is probably the most inhospitable area in South Africa, arid and largely with infertile soil and highly saline groundwater. Its wildlife, however, both fauna and flora, though sparse, are full of interest. Although the veld is too arid to bloom like that of the West Coast of Namaqualand, even when there is some spring rain, what does appear is highly unusual and often hauntingly beautiful. Vaalputs, a nuclear waste repository, has been sited between Bushmanland and Namaqualand, and acts as a de facto nature reserve.

See also
Bushmanland (South West Africa)

 
Geography of the Northern Cape
Karoo